United Nations Security Council Resolution 373, adopted unanimously on August 18, 1975, after examining the application of the Democratic Republic of São Tomé and Príncipe for membership in the United Nations, the Council recommended to the General Assembly that the Democratic Republic of São Tomé and Príncipe be admitted.

See also
 List of United Nations Security Council Resolutions 301 to 400 (1971–1976)

References
Text of the Resolution at undocs.org

External links
 

1975 in São Tomé and Príncipe
 0373
 0373
 0373
August 1975 events